This is a list of Israeli highways. Besides highways in Israel proper, it includes highways in the West Bank and the Golan Heights, because the Israeli administration maintains them in these areas.

There are 48 designated Israeli highways. Most of these are open-access arterial expressways, which may be entered from ordinary junctions. Some are limited-access freeways, which may be entered from interchanges. Six highways are freeways, six are partially limited-access freeways and partially expressways, and the other 35 are expressways.  There is only one three-digit road in the country classified as a freeway, Route 431. Highway 6, the Trans-Israel Highway, is the only toll road.

Two of the expressways (Highway 57 and Highway 60) are divided into several separate sections as a result of an IDF decree forbidding Israelis from traveling on certain stretches of these highways (see Notes below).

1–99

100–999
  Route 109
  Route 171
  Route 204
  Route 211
  Route 222
  Route 224
  Route 225
  Route 227
  Route 232
  Route 234
  Route 241
  Route 258
  Route 264
  Route 293
  Route 310
  Route 334
  Route 352
  Route 353
  Route 354
  Route 356
  Route 358
  Route 367
  Route 386
  Route 398
  Route 404 (Number was changed to 50)
  Route 406
  Route 410
  Route 411
  Route 412
  Route 417
  Route 423
  Route 436
  Route 437
  Route 431, Freeway
  Route 441
  Route 443
  Route 444
  Route 446
  Route 449
  Route 457
  Route 458
  Route 461
  Route 465
  Route 471 Freeway
  Route 481
  Route 482
  Route 491
  Route 505
  Route 508
  Route 531, Freeway
  Route 541
  Route 551
  Route 553
  Route 554
  Route 557
  Route 574
  Route 578
  Route 581
  Route 584
  Route 585
  Route 650
  Route 651
  Route 652
  Route 653
  Route 654
  Route 667
  Route 669
  Route 672
  Route 675
  Route 716
  Route 717
  Route 721
  Route 752
  Route 762
  Route 767
  Route 768
  Route 772
  Route 780
  Route 781
  Route 784
  Route 789
  Route 804
  Route 805
  Route 806
  Route 807
  Route 808
  Route 854
  Route 859 
  Route 864
  Route 866
  Route 869
  Route 886
  Route 888
  Route 899
  Route 918
  Route 959
  Route 977
  Route 978
  Route 999

See also
List of junctions and interchanges in Israel
Roads in Israel

Notes

External links
Map of Israel at mapa.co.il
Highways in Israel at Tamir Rental

Israel
Highways
Highways